Agliberto Melendez is a Dominican film director best known as the director of A One Way Ticket (Un Pasaje de Ida), the Dominican Republic's first feature-length film, produced entirely in the Dominican Republic by a Dominican cast and crew.  The film became known to American audiences after its 1988 debut in New York City at the Museum of Modern Art's New Directors/New Films Festival.  A One Way Ticket gained some notoriety because of its macabre subject matter; the story of would be immigrants who die in their desperate struggle to escape a fate of poverty and despair.  A One Way Ticket, shot under very adverse conditions, proved to everyone that it could be done.

In 1979 Agliberto Melendez founded the Cinemateca Nacional, quickly becoming the meeting place for like-minded film enthusiasts.  He single-handedly led the Cinemateca Nacional through very hard times but managed to stay afloat until it was finally forced to close its doors in 1986 following the election of right wing candidate Joaquín Balaguer. The Cinemateca Nacional introduced classics from the world cinema to a fresh and enthusiastic new audience.

His perseverance and single-minded vision made Agliberto Melendez the undisputed film pioneer of Dominican Cinema. He currently teaches cinema studies in the Dominican Republic and prepares his next feature: "Del Color de la Noche" based on the life of José Francisco Peña Gómez which he began preproduction this year.

External links 

 
 New York Times Review of One way Ticket

Dominican Republic film directors
Living people
Year of birth missing (living people)